"Hymn 43" is a song by British progressive rock group Jethro Tull. It is off their Aqualung album and was released as a single by Reprise Records. The song reached  91 on the Billboard Hot 100.

Background
Songwriter Ian Anderson described the song as "a blues for Jesus, about the gory, glory seekers who use his name as an excuse for a lot of unsavoury things. You know, 'Hey Dad, it's not my fault — the missionaries lied.'" Sean Murphy of PopMatters wrote that, "For “Hymn 43” Anderson sets his sights on the US and in quick order sets about decimating the hypocrisy and myth-making of religion and the new religion, entertainment."

According to the sheet music published at Musicnotes.com by Sony/ATV Music Publishing, the song is set in the time signature of common time. It is composed in the key of D Major with Anderson's vocal range spanning from G4 to Eb6.

Classic Rock History critic Skip Anderson ranked "Hymn 43" as Jethro Tull's 2nd best song, behind only "Thick as a Brick" and ahead of the more popular songs on Aqualung, "Aqualung" and "Locomotive Breath".

Chart performance

Personnel
Jethro Tull
 Ian Anderson – vocals, flute
 Clive Bunker – drums and percussion
 Martin Barre – electric guitar
 Jeffrey Hammond - bass guitar
 John Evan – piano, organ, mellotron

Covers
Morse/Portnoy/George released this as their third single off their 2020 album Cov3r to Cov3r on July 10, 2020.
A version by Alabama Thunderpussy was included on the compilation album, Sucking the 70's.

Popular culture
The song was later included in the video game Rock Band 2 as downloadable content.

References

1971 songs
Jethro Tull (band) songs
Songs written by Ian Anderson
Song recordings produced by Ian Anderson
Reprise Records singles